Cryptocodon is a genus  of plants in the family Campanulaceae. There is only one known species, Cryptocodon monocephalus, endemic to the Pamir Mountains of Tajikistan.

References

External links

Campanuloideae
Flora of Tajikistan
Monotypic Campanulaceae genera